Alexander Rödiger (born 14 May 1985) is a German bobsledder who has competed since 2006. He won a silver medal in the four-man event at the 2010 Winter Olympics in Vancouver.

Rödiger also won a silver medal in the four-man event at the FIBT World Championships 2009 in Lake Placid, New York.

Rödiger was part of the four-man crew that set start and track records at the 2008-09 Bobsleigh World Cup season opener in Winterberg, Germany.

His only other World Cup victory was at the track in Calgary in December 2006 and that was also in the four-man event.

Rödiger also finished second in the four-man event at the Junior FIBT World Championships in 2008.

External links

 
 
 
 

1985 births
Living people
People from Eisenach
German male bobsledders
Bobsledders at the 2010 Winter Olympics
Bobsledders at the 2014 Winter Olympics
Bobsledders at the 2018 Winter Olympics
Olympic bobsledders of Germany
Olympic silver medalists for Germany
Olympic medalists in bobsleigh
Medalists at the 2010 Winter Olympics
Medalists at the 2018 Winter Olympics
Sportspeople from Thuringia